Fontanelle is the second studio album by the American punk rock band Babes in Toyland, released on August 11, 1992 by Reprise Records. It was the band's first release on a major label, and their first recording to feature Maureen Herman on bass.

Recording
After extensive touring throughout 1991, the band entered the studio to record their major label follow-up to their debut album, Spanking Machine. Bassist Michelle Leon left the group in December 1991, shortly before the recording of Fontanelle began, due to the murder of Joe Cole, her then boyfriend. Maureen Herman was recruited as her replacement.

The album was co-produced by frontwoman and guitarist Kat Bjelland with Lee Ranaldo of Sonic Youth heading production. Brian Paulson was also studio engineer and the final product was mixed by Dave Ogilvie. The cover photo — an image of a naked doll held up in front of a mirror — was taken for the album by photographer Cindy Sherman.

The band has explained the album's name as referring to the soft spot on the top of a baby's skull, as well as to a little fountain used by fairies. It is also the name of a magician consulted by Gilles de Rais, the real-life murderer who inspired the fairy tale "Bluebeard".

The process of recording the album is described in the book Babes in Toyland: The Making and Selling of a Rock and Roll Band, by Neal Karlen. Recording took place at Pachyderm Studio in Cannon Falls, Minnesota, and at Sorcerer Sound Recording Studios in New York City.

Reception

Fontanelle is Babes in Toyland's most critically and commercially successful album, selling 220,000 copies approximately in the United States alone. Reviews of the album were very positive, with Steve Huey from AllMusic noting:
Measured by any standard, Fontanelle is a frighteningly primal record, one whose sheer ferocity Babes in Toyland never quite captured this convincingly anywhere else. 

The album's success also prompted them to tour more and were eventually offered a place on the Lollapalooza tour in 1993, playing alongside such acts as Tool, Primus, Alice in Chains, Dinosaur Jr. and Rage Against the Machine. During dates at Lollapalooza, the band released their third and final EP, Painkillers, in June 1993, which consisted of a re-recording of one of their most notable songs "He's My Thing", and outtakes from Fontanelle.

Track listing

Personnel
All personnel credits adapted from the album's liner notes.

Babes in Toyland
Kat Bjelland – vocals, guitar
Maureen Herman - bass
Lori Barbero – drums, vocals (6)

Technical personnel
Lee Ranaldo – producer, engineer
Kat Bjelland – producer
Brian Paulson – engineer
John Armstrong – assistant engineer
John Azelvandre – assistant engineer
Eric S. Anderson – assistant engineer
Howie Weinberg – mastering
Dave Ogilvie – mixing

Design personnel
Tom Recchion – art direction, design
Cindy Sherman – photography (front cover)
Michael Lavine – photography (inlay)
Fredrik Nilsen – photography (inlay)

Chart positions

References

External links

Babes in Toyland (band) albums
1992 albums
Reprise Records albums